Mount Kenya (Kikuyu: Kĩrĩnyaga, Kamba, Ki Nyaa) is the highest mountain in Kenya and the second-highest in Africa, after Kilimanjaro. The highest peaks of the mountain are Batian, Nelion and Point Lenana. Mount Kenya is the source of the name of the Republic of Kenya.

Mount Kenya is a volcano created approximately 3 million years after the opening of the East African Rift. It was covered by an ice cap for thousands of years. This has resulted in very eroded slopes and numerous valleys radiating from the peak. There are currently 11 small glaciers, which are shrinking rapidly, and may disappear by 2050. The forested slopes are an important source of water for much of Kenya.

There are several vegetation bands from the base to the peak. The lower slopes are covered by different types of forest. Many alpine species are endemic to Mount Kenya, such as the giant lobelias and senecios and a local subspecies of rock hyrax. An area of  around the centre of the mountain was designated a National Park and listed as a UNESCO World Heritage Site in 1997. The park receives over 16,000 visitors per year.

Mount Kenya National Park

Mount Kenya National Park, established in 1949, protects the region surrounding the mountain. Currently the national park is within the forest reserve which encircles it. In April 1978 the area was designated a UNESCO Biosphere Reserve. The national park and the forest reserve, combined, became a UNESCO World Heritage Site in 1997.

The Government of Kenya had four reasons for creating a national park on and around Mount Kenya. These were the importance of tourism for the local and national economies, preserve an area of great scenic beauty, conserve the biodiversity within the park and to preserve the water catchment for the surrounding area.

Kenya's government has announced a project to discourage animals from straying into small holdings surrounding the Park and devastating crops. The project will see the Park enclosed by an electric fence with five electrified strands. Kenya's Rhino Ark Trust, a non-profit organization, has been putting up fences in key areas around the country. As of 2021, 250 kilometres (160 miles) out of a planned 450 kilometres (280 miles) has been constructed in the Mt. Kenya area. The fence discharges an electric shock, but is not dangerous to humans or animals.

Local culture

The main ethnic groups living around Mount Kenya are Kikuyu, Ameru, Embu and Maasai. The first three are closely related. They all see the mountain as an important aspect of their cultures. All these cultures arrived in the Mount Kenya area in the last several hundred years.

Kikuyu

The Kikuyu live on the southern and western sides of the mountain. They are agriculturalists, and make use of the highly fertile volcanic soil on the lower slopes. They believe that God, Ngai or Mwene Nyaga, lived on Mount Kenya when he came down from the sky. They believe that the mountain is Ngai's throne on earth. It is the place where Gĩkũyũ, the father of the tribe, used to meet with God. Thus according to the Kikuyu records, Gĩkũyũ is the first person on Earth to ascend the mountain. 'Mwene Nyaga' in Kikuyu language can also translate as the "Owner of the Ostriches" or "Owner of the white patches (of snow)" where 'Mwene' translates to 'owner', and 'Nyaga' to Ostriches or white patches. The snow (in Kikuyu: Ira) caps of the mountain symbolically represent a crown on God's habitation .
Kikuyu used to build their houses with the doors facing the mountain.  The Kikuyu name for Mount Kenya is Kirima Kĩrĩ Nyaga (Mt.Kirinyaga), which literally translates to the mountain that which has the "Nyaga" – Ostriches.The mountain therefore is locally accepted as 'God's Resting Place' or 'Where God Lives'.

The Kikuyu name for Mt. Kenya is Kĩrĩnyaga  which literally means ‘the one with the ostrich’. The ostrich has black or brownish–grey feathers with patches of white. The Kikuyu attributed an ostrich likeness to an object that was dark coloured with white patches. The name Kĩrĩnyaga therefore figuratively means ‘the one with white patches’, referring to the glaciers among the peaks of the mountain.

Translated to the Kamba language, kĩrĩnyaga, would be ki nyaa. This is the name that Ludwig Kraph was given when he sighted the mountain from Kitui (in Kamba country). He recorded it as Kenya. It became the name of not only the mountain but also the country.

Embu
The Embu people live to the south-east of Mount Kenya, and believe that the mountain is God's home (the Embu word for God is Ngai or Mwene Njeru). The mountain is sacred, and they build their houses with the doors facing towards it. The Embu people are closely related to the Ameru and Mbeere people. The Mbeere and Akamba are the settlers of the southeast side of the mountain.

Ameru
The Ameru occupy the east, north and north-western slopes of the mountain. They are generally agricultural and also keep livestock and occupy what is among the most fertile land in Kenya. The Meru god Murungu was from the skies. Their name for Mt. Kenya is Kirimara, which means 'mountain with white features'.

Maasai

The Maasai are semi-nomadic people, who use the land to the north of the mountain to graze their cattle. They believe that their ancestors came down from the mountain at the beginning of time. The Maasai name for Mount Kenya is Ol Donyo Keri, which means 'mountain of stripes', referring to the dark shades as observed from the surrounding plains. At least one Maasai prayer refers to Mount Kenya:

Geology

Mount Kenya is a stratovolcano that was active in the Plio-Pleistocene. Since it became extinct there have been two major periods of glaciation, which are shown by two main rings of moraines below the glaciers. After studying the moraines, Gregory put forward the theory that at one time the whole summit of the mountain was covered with an ice cap, and it was this that eroded the peaks to how they are today.

The lower slopes of the mountain have never been glaciated. They are now mainly cultivated and forested. They are distinguished by steep-sided V-shaped valleys with many tributaries. Higher up the mountain, in the area that is now moorland, the valleys become U-shaped and shallower with flatter bottoms. These were created by glaciation.

When Mount Kenya was active there was some satellite activity. The north-eastern side of the mountain has many old volcanic plugs and craters. The largest of these, Ithanguni, even had its own ice cap when the main peaks were covered in ice. This can be seen by the smoothed summit of the peak. Circular hills with steep sides are also frequent in this area, which are probably the remains of small plugged vents. However, as the remaining mountain is roughly symmetrical, most of the activity must have occurred at the central plug.

The rocks that form Mount Kenya are mainly basalts, rhomb porphyrites, phonolites, kenytes and trachytes. Kenyte was first reported by Gregory in 1900 following his study of the geology of Mount Kenya.

The geology of the Mount Kenya area was first described scientifically by Joseph Thomson in 1883. He saw the mountain from the nearby Laikipia Plateau and wrote that it was an extinct volcano with the plug exposed. However, as he had only seen the mountain from a distance his description was not widely believed in Europe, particularly after 1887 when Teleki and von Höhnel ascended the mountain and described what they considered to be the crater. He confirmed that the volcano was extinct and that there were glaciers present. The first thorough survey by Europeans was not undertaken until 1966.

Peaks

The peaks of Mount Kenya are almost all of a volcanic origin. The majority of the peaks are located near the centre of the mountain. These peaks have an Alpine appearance due to their craggy nature. Typically of Alpine terrain, the highest peaks and gendarmes occur at the intersection of ridges. The central peaks only have a few mosses, lichens and small alpine plants growing in rock crevices. Further away from the central peaks, the volcanic plugs are covered in volcanic ash and soils. The vegetation growing on these peaks is typical for their vegetation band.

The highest peaks are Batian, Nelion and Pt Lenana. Coryndon Peak is the next-highest, but unlike the previous peaks it does not form a part of the central plug.

Other peaks around the central plug include Pt Piggot, Pt Dutton, Pt John, Pt John Minor, Krapf Rognon, Pt Peter, Pt Slade and Midget Peak. All of these have a steep pyramidal form.

Significant craggy outlying peaks include Terere and Sendeyo which form a pair of twin peaks to the north of the main plug. Together, they form a large parasitic plug. Other notable peaks include The Hat, Delamere Peak, Macmillan Peak and Rotundu.

Glaciers

The glaciers on Mount Kenya are retreating rapidly. The Mountain Club of Kenya in Nairobi has photographs showing the mountain at the time of the first recorded ascent in 1899, and again more recently; the retreat of the glaciers is very evident. Descriptions of ascents of several of the peaks advise on the use of crampons, but this is true only in some cases and at higher elevations. Every year there is less new snow accumulating in winter than melting on summer, even on the Lewis Glacier (the largest of them) in winter, so there is no formation of new ice. It is predicted to be less than 30 years before there will no longer be ice on Mount Kenya. Glacial retreat and disappearance can be caused by change in temperature trends, or by change in precipitation trends.

The glacier names are (clockwise from the north):
  Northey, Krapf, Gregory, Lewis, Diamond, Darwin, Forel, Heim, Tyndall, Cesar, Josef.

Periglacial landforms
Although Mount Kenya is on the equator the freezing nightly temperatures result in periglacial landforms. There is permafrost a few centimetres (inches) below the surface. These mounds grow because the repeated freezing and thawing of the ground draws in more water. There are blockfields present around  where the ground has cracked to form hexagons. Solifluction occurs when the night temperatures freeze the soil before it thaws again in the morning. This daily expansion and contraction of the soil prevents the establishment of vegetation.

Rivers

Mount Kenya is the main water catchment area for two large rivers in Kenya; the Tana, the largest river in Kenya, and the Ewaso Nyiro North. The Mount Kenya ecosystem provides water directly for over 2 million people. The rivers on Mount Kenya have been named after the villages on the slopes of the mountain that they flow close to. The Thuchi River is the district boundary between Tharaka Nithi and Embu. Mount Kenya is a major water tower for the Tana river which in 1988 supplied 80% of Kenya's electricity using a series of seven hydroelectric powerstations and dams.

The density of streams is very high, especially on the lower slopes which have never been glaciated. The ice cap which used to cover the mountain during the Pliocene eroded large U-shaped valleys which tend to only have one large stream.
Where the original shape of the shield volcano is still preserved, there have been millions of years for streams to erode the hillside. This area is therefore characterised by frequent deep fluvial V-shaped valleys.
 
The gradual transition from glaciated to fluvial valley can be clearly observed.

Rivers which start on Mount Kenya are the tributaries of two large Kenyan rivers: the Tana and the Ewaso Ng'iro rivers. A lot of Mount Kenyan rivers flow into the Sagana which itself is a tributary of the Tana, which it joins at the Masinga Reservoir. The rivers in the northern part of the mountain, such as the Burguret, Naru Moru, Nanyuki, Likii, Sirimon flow into the Ewaso Nyiro. The rivers to the south-west, such as the Keringa and Nairobi flow into the Sagana and then into the Tana. The remaining rivers to the south and east, such as the Kathitâ(Largest River in Meru),Mutonga, Nithi, Thuchi and Nyamindi, flow directly into the Tana.

Natural history

Mount Kenya has several altitudinal ecological zones, between the savanna surrounding the mountain to the nival zone by the glaciers. Each zone has a dominant species of vegetation. Many of the species found higher up the mountain are endemic, either to Mount Kenya or East Africa.

There are also differences within the zones, depending on the side of the mountain and aspect of the slope. The south-east is much wetter than the north, so species more dependent on moisture are able to grow. Some species, such as the bamboo Yushania alpina, are limited to certain aspects of the mountain because of the amount of moisture.

Zones

The climate of Mount Kenya changes considerably with altitude, forming belts of community types. Around the base of the mountain is fertile farmland. The people living around the mountain have cultivated this cool relatively moist area for centuries.

Mount Kenya is surrounded by forests. The vegetation in the forests depend on rainfall, and the species present differ greatly between the northern and southern slopes. As time has passed the trees on the edge of the forest have been logged and the farmland has encroached further up the fertile slopes of the mountain.

Above the forest is a belt of Yushania alpina African alpine bamboo. This zone is almost continuous, but is restricted to small isolated bunches in the north because of low rainfall. The bamboo is natural, and does not require forest disturbance. Tracks are common through the bamboo. Bamboo suppresses other vegetation, so it is uncommon to find trees or other plants here.

Above the bamboo is the timberline forest. The trees here are often smaller than the trees in the forests lower down the mountain. The forest here is more intact, because it is less accessible and better protected.

Heathland is found in the wetter areas, on the west side of Mount Kenya, and is dominated by giant heathers. Chaparral is found in the drier areas and grasses are more common. and bush fires still occur.

As the altitude increases the temperature fluctuations become extreme and the air becomes thinner and drier. This region is known as the Afro-alpine zone. Many of the species here are endemic, with adaptations to the cold and fluctuating temperatures. Typical plants here include giant groundsels (senecios) and giant lobelias.

The region where the glaciers have recently retreated from is nival zone. It is the area that plants have not yet been able to colonise.

Flora

The flora found on Mount Kenya varies with altitude, aspect and exposure. As the altitude increases, the plants have to be more specialised, with adaptations to strong sunlight with ultraviolet, lower mean temperatures and freezing night temperatures.

Plants in the Afro-alpine zone have overcome these difficulties in several ways. One adaptation is known as the giant rosette, which is exhibited by giant senecio, giant lobelia and giant thistle (Carduus), which use bud leaves to protect their buds from freezing. Giant rosette senecios form single-aged stands that drive community structure over decades.

Many plant species in the Afro-alpine zone of Mount Kenya are giant versions of lowland (or temperate) relatives. However, nearer the nival zone the plants decrease in size again.

Fauna

The majority of animals live lower down on the slopes of Mount Kenya. Here there is more vegetation and the climate is less extreme. Various species of monkeys, several antelopes, tree hyrax, porcupines and some larger animals such as elephant and buffalo all live in the forest. Predators found here include hyena and leopard, and occasionally lion.

There are fewer mammals found at high altitudes on Mount Kenya. The Mount Kenya hyrax and common duiker are able to live here, and are important to the ecosystem. Some smaller mammals, such as the groove-toothed rat, can live here by burrowing into the giant senecios and using their thick stem of dead leaves as insulation. The Mount Kenya mole-rat Tachyoryctes rex occurs at high altitudes, living in visible mounds. Leopards are resident in the alpine zone.

Other mammal species are only occasional visitors. Remains of elephants, monkeys and bongo have been found high in the alpine zone, and other sightings are remembered in names such as Simba Tarn (simba means lion in Swahili).

Several bird species live in the Afro-alpine zone, including sunbirds, alpine chats and starlings and the raptors, augur buzzard, lammergeier and Verreaux's eagle, the latter of which specializes in hunting hyraxes. Birds are important in this ecosystem as pollinators.

Climate

The climate of Mount Kenya has played a critical role in the development of the mountain, influencing the topography and ecology amongst other factors. It has a typical equatorial mountain climate which Hedberg described as winter every night and summer every day. Mount Kenya is home to one of the Global Atmosphere Watch's atmospheric monitoring stations.

Seasons

The year is divided into two distinct wet seasons and two distinct dry seasons which mirror the wet and dry seasons in the Kenyan lowlands. The lower, south eastern slopes are the wettest as the predominant weather system comes from the Indian ocean. This rainfall supports dense montane forest on these slopes. High on the mountain most of the precipitation falls as snow. Combined, these water sources feed 11 glaciers.

The current climate on Mount Kenya is wet, but drier than it has been in the past. The temperatures span a wide range, which diminishes with altitude. In the lower alpine zone temperature usually do not go below . Snow and rain are common from March to December, but especially in the two wet seasons. The wet seasons combined account for 5/6 of the annual precipitation. The monsoon, which controls the wet and dry seasons, means that most of the year there are south-easterly winds, but during January and February the dominant wind direction is north-easterly.

Mount Kenya, like most locations in the tropics, has two wet seasons and two dry seasons as a result of the monsoon. From mid-March to June the heavy rain season, known as the long rains, brings approximately half of the annual rainfall on the mountain. This is followed by the wetter of the two dry seasons which lasts until September. October to December are the short rains when the mountain receives approximately a third of its rainfall total. Finally from December to mid-March is the drier dry season when the mountain experiences the least rain.

Daily pattern
During the dry season the mountain almost always follows the same daily weather pattern. Large daily temperature fluctuations occur which led Hedberg to exclaim winter every night and summer every day. There is variation in minimum and maximum temperatures day to day, but the standard deviation of the mean hourly pattern is small.

A typical day is clear and cool in the morning with low humidity. The mountain is in direct sunlight which causes the temperatures to rise quickly with the warmest temperatures occurring between 0900 and 1200. The anabatic winds caused by warm rising air gradually bring these clouds to the summit region in the afternoon. Around 1500 there is a minimum in sunlight and a maximum in humidity causing the actual and perceived temperature to drop. At 1600 there is a minimum in the pressure. This daily cover of cloud protects the glaciers on the south-west of the mountain which would otherwise get direct sun every day, enhancing their melt. The upwelling cloud eventually reaches the dry easterly air streams and dissipates, leading to a clear sky by 5 P.M. There is another maximum of temperature associated with this.

Being an equatorial mountain the daylight hours are constant with twelve-hour days. Sunrise is about 0630 with the sun setting at 1830 (both EAT = UTC+3). Over the course of the year there is a one-minute difference between the shortest and longest days. At night, the sky is usually clear with katabatic winds blowing down the valleys. Above the lower alpine zone there is usually frost every night.

History

European sighting

The first European to report seeing Mount Kenya was Dr Johann Ludwig Krapf, a German missionary, from Kitui,
The sighting was made on 3 December 1849,
a year after the first sighting of Mount Kilimanjaro by a European.

Krapf was told by the Embu people that lived around the mountain that they did not ascend high enough on the mountain because of the intense cold and the white matter that rolled down the mountains with a loud noise. This led him to infer that glaciers existed on the mountain. It was Krapf who gave the mountain the name "Kenya", but the derivation of this is not known with certainty.

Krapf also noted that the rivers flowing from Mount Kenya, and other mountains in the area, were continuously flowing. This was very different from the other rivers in the area, which swelled up in the wet season and completely dried up after the rainy season had ended. As the streams flowed even in the driest seasons he concluded that there must be a source of water up on the mountain, in the form of glaciers. He believed the mountain to be the source of the White Nile.

In 1851 Krapf returned to Kitui. He travelled  closer to the mountain, but did not see it again. In 1877 Hildebrandt was in the Kitui area and heard stories about the mountain, but also did not see it. Since there were no confirmations to back up Krapf's claim people began to be suspicious.

Eventually, in 1883, Joseph Thomson passed close by the west side of the mountain and confirmed Krapf's claim. He diverted his expedition and reached  up the slopes of the mountain but had to retreat because of trouble with local people. However, the first European exploration high onto the mountain was achieved in 1887 by Count Sámuel Teleki. He managed to reach  on the south western slopes. On this expedition Teleki mistakenly believed he had found the crater of a volcano.

In 1892, Teleki and von Höhnel returned to the eastern side, but were unable to get through the forest.

Finally, in 1893, an expedition managed to ascend Mount Kenya as far as the glaciers. This expedition was traveling from the coast to Lake Baringo in the Rift Valley, and was led by Dr John W Gregory, a British geologist. On his return to Britain, Gregory published papers and a narrative account of his achievements.

George Kolb, a German physician, made expeditions in 1894 and 1896 and was the first to reach the moorlands on the east side of the mountain. More exploration occurred after 1899 when the Uganda Railway was completed as far as the future site of Nairobi.

Mackinder's expedition
On 28 July 1899, Sir Halford John Mackinder set out from the site of Nairobi on an expedition to Mount Kenya. The members of the expedition consisted of 6 Europeans, 66 Swahilis, 2 Maasai guides, and 96 Kikuyu. The Europeans were Campbell B. Hausberg, second in command and photographer; Douglas Saunders, botanist; C F Camburn, taxidermist; Cesar Ollier, guide; and Josef Brocherel, guide and porter.
The expedition made it as far as the mountain, but encountered many difficulties on the way. The country they passed through was full of plague and famine. Many Kikuyu porters tried to desert with women from the villages, and others stole from the villages, which made the chiefs very hostile towards the expedition. When they reached the base camp on 18 August, they could not find any food, suffered two of their party killed by the local people, and eventually had to send Saunders to Naivasha to get help from Captain Gorges, the Government Officer there.

He made his first attempt on the summit on 30 August with Ollier and Brocherel up the south east face, but they had to retreat when they were within  of the summit of Nelion due to nightfall.

On 5 September, Hausberg, Ollier, and Brocherel made a circuit of the main peaks looking for an easier route to the summit. They could not find one. On 11 September Ollier and Brocherel made an ascent of the Darwin Glacier, but were forced to retreat due to a blizzard.

When Saunders returned from Naivasha with the relief party, Mackinder had another attempt at the summit with Ollier and Brocherel. They traversed the Lewis Glacier and climbed the south east face of Nelion. They spent the night near the gendarme, and traversed the snowfield at the head of the Darwin Glacier at dawn before cutting steps up the Diamond Glacier. They reached the summit of Batian at noon on 13 September 1899, and descended by the same route.

1900–1930

After the first ascent of Mount Kenya there were fewer expeditions there for a while. The majority of the exploration until after the First World War was by settlers in Kenya, who were not on scientific expeditions. A Church of Scotland mission was set up in Chogoria, and several Scottish missionaries ascended to the peaks, including Rev Dr. J. W. Arthur, G. Dennis and A. R. Barlow. There were other ascents, but none succeeded in summitting Batian or Nelion.

New approach routes were cleared through the forest, which made access to the peaks area far easier. In 1920, Arthur and Sir Fowell Buxton tried to cut a route in from the south, and other routes came in from Nanyuki in the north, but the most commonly used was the route from the Chogoria mission in the east, built by Ernest Carr. Carr is also credited with building Urumandi and Top Huts.

On 6 January 1929 the first ascent of Nelion was made by Percy Wyn-Harris and Eric Shipton. They climbed the Normal Route, then descended to the Gate of Mists before ascending Batian. On 8 January they reascended, this time with G. A. Sommerfelt, and in December Shipton made another ascent with R. E. G. Russell. They also made the first ascent of Point John. During this year the Mountain Club of East Africa was formed.

At the end of July 1930, Shipton and Bill Tilman made the first traverse of the peaks. They ascended by the West Ridge of Batian, traversed the Gate of Mists to Nelion, and descended the Normal Route. During this trip, Shipton and Tilman made first ascents of several other peaks, including Point Peter, Point Dutton, Midget Peak, Point Pigott and either Terere or Sendeyo.

1931 to present day
In the early 1930s there were several visits to the moorlands around Mount Kenya, with fewer as far as the peaks. Raymond Hook and Humphrey Slade ascended to map the mountain, and stocked several of the streams with trout. By 1938 there had been several more ascents of Nelion. In February, Miss C Carroll and Mtu Muthara became the first woman and African respectively to ascend Nelion, in an expedition with Noel Symington, author of The Night Climbers of Cambridge, and on 5 March Miss Una Cameron became the first woman to ascend Batian.

During the Second World War there was another drop in ascents of the mountain. The most remarkable ascent during this period was by three Italians who were being held in a British POW camp at the base of the mountain in Nanyuki. They escaped from camp to climb the mountain's third peak, Point Lenana, before "escaping" back into camp. Felice Benuzzi, the team leader, retold his story in the book No Picnic on Mount Kenya (1946).

In 1949 the Mountain Club of Kenya split from the Mountain Club of East Africa, and the area above  was designated a National Park. A road was built from Naro Moru to the moorlands, allowing easier access.

Many new routes were climbed on Batian and Nelion in the next three decades, and in October 1959 the Mountain Club of Kenya produced their first guide to Mount Kenya and Kilimanjaro. On Kenyan independence in 1963, Kisoi Munyao raised the Kenyan flag at the top of the mountain. He died in 2007 and was given a heroic funeral attended by Kenyan president Mwai Kibaki. In the early 1970s the Mount Kenya National Park Mountain Rescue Team was formed, and by the end of the 1970s all major routes on the peaks had been climbed.

On 19 July 2003, a South African registered aircraft, carrying 12 passengers and two crew, crashed into Mount Kenya at Point Lenana; nobody survived. This was not the first aircraft lost on the mountain; there is also the wreckage of at least one helicopter that crashed before 1972.

In March 2012 a massive fire raged on Mount Kenya, devouring thousands of hectares of ancient forests and endangered wildlife.

Mountaineering

Climbing routes

Most of the peaks on Mount Kenya have been summited. The majority of these involve rock climbing as the easiest route, although some only require a scramble or a walk. The highest peak that can be ascended without climbing is Point Lenana, . The majority of the 15,000 visitors to the national park each year climb this peak. In contrast, approximately 200 people summit Nelion and 50 summit Batian, the two highest peaks.

When ascended directly, Batian is usually climbed via the North Face Standard Route, UIAA grade IV+ (or 5.6+ YDS). The first recorded ascent of Batian was on 13 September 1899 by Sir Halford John Mackinder, Cesar Ollier and Josef Brocherel. The Normal Route is the most climbed route up Nelion, and thence across to Batian. It was first climbed by Eric Shipton and Percy Wyn-Harris on 6 January 1929. It is possible to traverse between the two peaks, via the Gates of Mist, but this often involves spending a night in the Howell hut on top of Nelion. There is a bolted abseil descent route off Nelion.

Mount Kenya's climbing seasons are a result of its location only  from the equator. During the northern summer the rock routes on the north side of the peak are in good summer condition, while at the same time the ice routes on the south side of the peak are prime shape. The situation is reversed during the southern summer. The two seasons are separated by several months of rainy season before and after, during which climbing conditions are generally unfavorable.

Mount Kenya is home to several good ice routes, the two most famous being the Diamond Couloir and the Ice Window route. Snow and ice levels on the mountain have been retreating at an accelerated rate in recent years, making these climbs increasingly difficult and dangerous. The Diamond Couloir, a steep ice couloir fed by the fusion of the upper Diamond Glacier, was first climbed by National Park staff Phil Snyder and Thumbi Mathenge in October 1973. A direct finish was pioneered in 1975 by Yvon Chouinard and Michael Covington The couloir was once climbable in summer or winter but now is virtually unclimbable in summer conditions and is seldom deemed in climbable condition even in winter. Last climbing reports describe the route very difficult, especially in the lower section. The route has changed into a modern ice climb with a very difficult 60m first pitch, starting with 8m of overhanging M7 dry tooling, followed by 50m of USA Grade V ice and by others 6 pitches of moderate climbing on good ice and finally one pitch of water ice USA Grade IV+ ice at the headwall before getting to the Upper Diamond Glacier.

The satellite peaks around the mountain also provide good climbs. These can be climbed in Alpine style and vary in difficulty from a scramble to climbing at UIAA grade VI. They are useful for acclimatisation before climbing the higher peaks and as ascents in their own right.

Walking routes

There are eight walking routes up to the main peaks. Starting clockwise from the north these are the: Meru, Chogoria, Kamweti, Naro Moru, Burguret, Sirimon and Timau Routes.
Of these Chogoria, Naro Moru and Sirimon are used most frequently and therefore have staffed gates. The other routes require special permission from the Kenya Wildlife Service to use.

The Chogoria route leads from Chogoria town up to the peaks circuit path. It heads through the forest to the south-east of the mountain to the moorland, with views over areas such as Ithanguni and the Giant's Billiards Table before following the Gorges Valley past the Temple and up to Simba Col below Point Lenana. The Mountain Club of Kenya claims that Ithanguni and the Giant's Billiards Table offer some of the best hillwalking in Kenya.

The Naro Moru route is taken by many of the trekkers who try to reach Point Lenana. It can be ascended in only 3 days and has bunkhouses at each camp. The route starts at Naro Moru town to the west of the mountain and climbs towards Mackinder's Camp before joining the Peak Circuit Path. The terrain is usually good, although one section is called the Vertical Bog.

The Sirimon route approaches Mount Kenya from the north-west. The path splits on the moorlands, with the more frequently used fork following the Mackinder Valley and the quieter route traversing into the Liki North Valley. The paths rejoin at Shipton's Cave just below Shipton's Camp on the Peak Circuit Path.

It can be walked in one day, but more commonly takes two or three. It can also be used to join different ascent and descent routes. The route does not require technical climbing.

Recent development
Development is currently underway for a new route up the mountain starting from the Ragati conservancy and running up the ridge between the Naro Moru route and the old Kamweti trail.

Accommodation
Accommodation on Mount Kenya ranges from very basic to luxurious. The more luxurious lodges are found on the lower slopes, in and around the forest.
These lodges have hotel-style accommodation, often with log fires and hot running water. Many offer guided walks and other activities such as fishing and birdwatching.

The huts higher on the mountain are more basic. Most have several bunkrooms with beds, and also offer somewhere to rest, cook and eat. Some also have running water. A few huts are very basic bothies and offer only a space to sleep that is sheltered from the weather. Beds in the huts can be reserved at the park gates.
Camping is allowed anywhere in the National Park, but it is most encouraged around the huts to limit environmental impact. It is possible for campers to use the communal spaces in the huts for no extra fee.

Etymology

The origin of the name Kenya is not clear, but perhaps linked to the Kikuyu, Embu and Kamba words Kirinyaga, Kirenyaa and Kiinyaa which mean "God's resting place" in all three languages.

In the 19th Century, the German explorer, Ludwig Krapf, recorded the name as both Kenia and Kegnia believed by some to be a corruption of the Kamba version.
Others however say that this was on the contrary a very precise notation of the correct African pronunciation .
 Wangari Maathai tells the following story about the naming: Krapf and Johannes Rebmann asked their guide, a member of the Kamba community, who was carrying a gourd, what they called the mountain, and the guide, believing that the Germans were referring to the gourd, replied kĩĩ-nyaa, which became the name of the mountain and then the country. 
The European pronunciation has been abandoned in modern times, in favor of the African version.

Names of peaks
The peaks of Mount Kenya have been given names from three different sources. Firstly, several Maasai chieftains have been commemorated, with names such as Batian, Nelion and Lenana. They commemorate Mbatian, a Maasai Laibon (Medicine Man), Nelieng, his brother, and Lenana and Sendeyo, his sons. Terere is named after another Maasai headman.

The second type of names that were given to peaks are after European climbers and explorers. Some examples of this are Shipton, Sommerfelt, Tilman, Dutton and Arthur.

The remaining names are after well-known Kenyan personalities, with the exception of John and Peter, which were named by the missionary Arthur after two disciples. There is a group of four peaks to the east of the main peaks named after European settlers; Coryndon, Grigg, Delamere and McMillan.

See also
 List of volcanoes in Kenya
 Volcanic Seven Summits

References

Further reading

 Best, Nicholas (2014). Point Lenana. Thistle Publishing/Kindle Single.

  A full survey of the long glacial and periglacial reconstructive history of Mt. Kenya, its geological and environmental settings, sequences of paleosols (ancient soils) and their significance in understanding the multiplicity of glaciations.

External links

 
East African montane forests
Eastern Province (Kenya)
Extinct volcanoes
Mountains of Kenya
Seven Second Summits
Stratovolcanoes of Kenya
Volcanic plugs of Africa
Volcanoes of the Great Rift Valley
Five-thousanders of Africa
Highest points of countries
History of Kenya
Pliocene Africa
Pliocene stratovolcanoes
Protected areas of Kenya
Protected areas established in 1949
1949 establishments in Kenya
World Heritage Sites in Kenya